The following is a list of leaders of Communist Chechnya, encompassing leaders of the Chechen Autonomous Oblast (the Chechen AO), the Chechen-Ingush Autonomous Oblast (the Chechen-Ingush AO), the Chechen-Ingush Autonomous Soviet Socialist Republic (the Chechen-Ingush ASSR) and the Grozny Oblast.

It lists heads of state, heads of government and heads of the local branch of the Communist Party of the Soviet Union.

During its existence, Communist Chechnya was a part of the Russian Soviet Federative Socialist Republic (the Russian SFSR).

Heads of state

Heads of government

Heads of party

See also
 Head of the Chechen Republic
 History of Chechnya
 Chechen Autonomous Oblast
 Chechen-Ingush Autonomous Oblast
 Chechen-Ingush Autonomous Soviet Socialist Republic
 1940–1944 insurgency in Chechnya
 1944 deportation of Chechens and Ingushes
 Grozny Oblast

References

Sources
 World Statesmen.org

Chechnya communist leaders
Chechnya communist leaders
Chechnya Head of State
Communist Chechnya
Communist Chechnya
Politics of the Soviet Union